This is a list of defunct airlines of Taiwan.

See also
 List of airlines of Taiwan
 List of airports in Taiwan

References

 
Taiwan
Airlines, defunct